The Govora Power Station is a large thermal power plant located in Râmnicu Vâlcea, having 4 generation groups of 50 MW each having a total electricity generation capacity of 200 MW.

Coordinates:

References

External links
Official site 

Natural gas-fired power stations in Romania